Woodstock Park is a public park located in the Woodstock neighborhood of southeast Portland, Oregon, in the United States.

Description and history
Operated by Portland Parks & Recreation, the park was acquired in 1921 and measures . SE 47th Avenue and SE 50th Avenue form the west and east boundaries; Woodstock Park is bounded by SE Steele Street to the north and by SE Harold Street and Woodstock School to the south.

Amenities include a dog off-leash area, horseshoe pit, paved paths, picnic tables, a playground, public art, restroom facilities, soccer and softball fields and tennis courts. The park is open between 5 a.m. and midnight daily. The park has hosted high school softball games, movies, Woodstock School reunions, and an annual event known as "Unimproved Road". In 2012, Portland Parks & Recreation budget cuts threatened to close Woodstock Park's restroom facility and reduce daily care.

See also
 List of parks in Portland, Oregon

References

External links
 

1921 establishments in Oregon
Parks in Portland, Oregon
Protected areas established in 1921
Woodstock, Portland, Oregon